Tristram Baumber (born 1978 in Canberra, Australia) is an Australian writer known for creating television shows such as The PM's Daughter, Timothy and The Cleanists, as well as writing for a number of other Australian television programs. Baumber's short comedy plays have been performed in various countries as part of the Short + Sweet festival.

Writing credits 
The PM's Daughter on ABC Television (2022)
Born to Spy on ABC Television (2021)
The Other Guy (series 2) on Stan (2019)
The Unlisted on ABC Television and Netflix (2019)
Timothy on ABC Television (2014)
The Cleanists on Showcase TV (2013–2014)
Wednesday Night Fever on ABC Television (2013)
Spaceman & Executioner as part of Short + Sweet theatre festival (2013-2014)
The House On Lawson Street as part of Short + Sweet theatre festival (2013)
Wisdom Of Solomon as part of Short + Sweet theatre festival (2012)
That's Confidence! as part of Short + Sweet theatre festival (2011-2012)

References

External links 

1978 births
Living people
Australian comedy writers
Australian television writers
People from Canberra
Australian male television writers